Mitsutani Kunishirō (Japanese: 満谷 国四郎; 10 November 1874, Okayama Prefecture – 12 July 1936 Tokyo) was a Japanese painter in the yōga style.

Life and work 
His uncle, was a businessman who also created some of the first Western-style paintings in Okayama. After graduating, in 1891, he went to Tokyo. The following year, he began studies with Koyama Shōtarō at his private school; "Fudō-sha" (不同社; roughly, Diversity). 

In 1900, he went to Europe to exhibit at the Exposition Universelle, won an award, and stayed there through 1901; taking a few lessons from Jean-Paul Laurens. Upon his return, he and some like-minded artists created "", an association devoted to Western-style painting.

In 1907, he served as a jury member at the first exhibition held by the Ministry of Culture. Later that same year, he was awarded first prize at the  sponsored by Tokyo Prefecture. He returned to Europe in 1911 for further studies, with financial assistance from Magosaburō Ōhara, and lived there until the outbreak of World War I in 1914.  

He was named a member of the Japan Art Academy in 1925. Over the next few years, he visited China four times. During this time, his works became more decorative in nature. During his later years, he was closely involved with the  Meiji Memorial Picture Gallery.

Sources 
 Sanpei Yoshioka (Ed.), Okayama Biographical Encyclopedia (岡山人名事典), Nikkei Publishing, 1994   
 Laurance P. Roberts: "Mitsutani Kunishirō", In: A Dictionary of Japanese Artists. Weatherhill, 1976. .

External links 

More works by Mitsutani @ ArtNet
A postcard designed by Mitsutani @ the U.S. National Library of Medicine

1874 births
1936 deaths
Japanese painters
Yōga painters
People from Okayama Prefecture
Artists from Okayama Prefecture